The Oman national beach handball team is the national team of Oman. It is governed by the Oman Handball Association and takes part in international beach handball competitions.

World Championship results

Asian Championship results

References

External links
IHF profile

Beach handball
National beach handball teams
Beach handball